Storage tanks are containers that hold liquids, compressed gases (gas tank; or in U.S.A "pressure vessel", which is not typically labeled or regulated as a storage tank) or mediums used for the short- or long-term storage of heat or cold. The term can be used for reservoirs (artificial lakes and ponds), and for manufactured containers. The usage of the word tank for reservoirs is uncommon in American English but is moderately common in British English. In other countries, the term tends to refer only to artificial containers.

In the USA, storage tanks operate under no (or very little) pressure, distinguishing them from pressure vessels. Storage tanks are often cylindrical in shape, perpendicular to the ground with flat bottoms, and a fixed frangible or floating roof. There are usually many environmental regulations applied to the design and operation of storage tanks, often depending on the nature of the fluid contained within. Above-ground storage tanks (ASTs) differ from underground storage tanks (USTs) in the kinds of regulations that are applied. Above ground storage tanks can be used to hold materials such as petroleum, waste matter, water, chemicals, and other hazardous materials, all while meeting strict industry standards and regulations.

Reservoirs can be covered, in which case they may be called covered or underground storage tanks or reservoirs. Covered water tanks are common in urban areas.

Storage tanks are available in many shapes: vertical and horizontal cylindrical; open top and closed top; flat bottom, cone bottom, slope bottom and dish bottom. Large tanks tend to be vertical cylindrical, or to have rounded corners transition from vertical side wall to bottom profile, to easier withstand hydraulic hydrostatically induced pressure of contained liquid. Most container tanks for handling liquids during transportation are designed to handle varying degrees of pressure. 

In order for volume measurements from the tank to be used, it shall have a capacity table created using appropriate standards. Each row of capacity table contains fill level value and corresponding volume value (and other related data).

A large storage tank is sometimes mounted on a lorry (truck) or on an articulated lorry trailer, which is then called a tanker.

In the U.S., air emissions, which correspond to  losses for usable liquid commodities and/or salable products, are typically required to undergo air quality permitting under the Federal Clean Air Act. Quantification of potential emissions for permitting purposes is most often accomplished by applying emission equations published in Chapter 7.1 of the U.S. EPA's AP-42: Compilation of Air Emission Factors.

Special features

Since most liquids can spill, evaporate, or seep through even the smallest opening, special consideration must be made for their safe and secure handling. This usually involves building a bunding, or containment dike, around the tank, so that any leakage may be safely contained.

Some storage tanks need a floating roof in addition to or in lieu of the fixed roof and structure.  This floating roof rises and falls with the liquid level inside the tank, thereby decreasing the vapor space above the liquid level. Floating roofs are considered a safety requirement as well as a pollution prevention measure for many industries including petroleum refining.

In the United States, metal tanks in contact with soil and containing petroleum products must be protected from corrosion to prevent escape of the product into the environment.  The most effective and common corrosion control techniques for steel in contact with soil is cathodic protection. Outside the United States and at some locations in the United States, elevated tank support foundations with a sand bitumen mix finish are often used. These type of foundations keep the tank bottom plates free from water, therefore preventing corrosion.

For refineries 

Tanks for a particular fluid are chosen according to the flash-point of that substance.  Generally in refineries and especially for liquid fuels, there are fixed roof tanks, and floating roof tanks. 
Fixed roof tanks are meant for liquids with very high flash points, (e.g. fuel oil, water, bitumen etc.) Cone roofs, dome roofs and umbrella roofs are usual. These are insulated to prevent the clogging of certain materials, wherein the heat is provided by steam coils within the tanks. Dome roof tanks are meant for tanks having slightly higher storage pressure than that of atmosphere (e.g. slop oil).
Floating roof tanks are broadly divided into external floating roof tanks (usually called floating roof tanks: FR Tanks) and internal floating roof types (IFR Tanks).
IFR tanks are used for liquids with low flash-points (e.g., ATF, MS. gasoline, ethanol). These tanks are nothing but cone roof tanks with a floating roof inside which travels up and down along with the liquid level. This floating roof traps the vapor from low flash-point fuels.  Floating roofs are supported with legs or cables on which they rest.
FR tanks do not have a fixed roof (it is open in the top) and has a floating roof only. Medium flash point liquids such as naphtha, kerosene, diesel, and crude oil are stored in these tanks.

One of the best types found in mining areas is the open roof type tank, usually to store ore slurries. These are the easiest storage tanks to build.

Other classifications which can be made for storage tanks are based upon their location in a refinery:
 COT- crude oil tank-ages
 PIT- product and intermediate storage tankages
 DISPATCH- dispatch area tankages
 UTILITIES- tanks made in the power plant area, for storage water etc.
 OSBL tanks- the first 3 types come under out side battery limit tankages
 ISBL tanks- these are usually mini tanks which are found in the production units of a refinery (as neutralisation tanks, water tanks etc.)

As flash-points of fuels go very low the tanks are usually spherical (known as spheres), to store LPG, hydrogen, hexane, nitrogen, oxygen etc.

Other types of tank

Atmospheric
An atmospheric tank is a container for holding a liquid at atmospheric pressure. The major design code for welded atmospheric tanks are API 650 and API 620. API 653 is used for analysis of in-service storage tanks. In Europe the design code is EN14015 using load cases from Eurocode 3 (EN 1993), part 4-2.

High pressure

In the case of a liquefied gas such as hydrogen or chlorine, or a compressed gas such as compressed natural gas or MAPP, the storage tank must be made to withstand the sometimes immense pressures exerted by the contents.  These tanks may be called cylinders and, being pressure vessels, are sometimes excluded from the class of "tanks".

Thermal storage tanks

One form of seasonal thermal energy storage (STES) is the use of large surface water tanks that are insulated and then covered with earth berms to enable the year-round of solar-thermal heat that is collected primarily in the summer for all-year heating.  A related technology has become widespread in Danish district heating systems. The thermal storage medium is gravel and water in large, shallow, lined pits that are covered with insulation, soil and grass.

Ice and slush tanks are used for short-term of cold for use in air conditioning, allowing refrigeration equipment to be run at night when electric power is less expensive, yet provide cooling during hot daytime hours.

Milk tank

A bulk milk cooling tank is a storage tank located in a dairy farm's milkhouse used for cooling and holding fluid milk at a low temperature until it can be picked up by a milk hauler. Since milk leaves the udder at approximately 35 °C, milk tanks are needed to rapidly cool fresh raw milk to a storage temperature of 4 °C to 6 °C, thereby slowing growth of microorganisms. Bulk milk cooling tanks are usually made of stainless steel and are constructed to sanitary standards. It must be cleaned after each milk collection. The milk cooling tank may be the property of the farmer, or may be rented by the farmer from a dairy plant.

Septic tank

A septic tank is part of a small scale sewage treatment system often referred to as a septic system. Septic systems are commonly used to treat wastewater from homes and small businesses in rural and suburban areas. It consists of the tank and a septic drain field. Waste water enters the tank where solids can settle and scum floats. Anaerobic digestion occurs on the settled solids, reducing the volume of solids. The water released by the system is normally absorbed by the drain field without needing any further treatment.

Mobile "storage" tanks
While not strictly a "storage" tank, mobile tanks share many of the same features of storage tanks. Also, they must be designed to deal with a heavy sloshing load and the risk of collision or other accident. Some of these include ocean-going oil tankers and LNG carriers; railroad tank cars; and the road and highway traveling tankers. Also included are the holding tanks which are the tanks that store toilet waste on RVs, boats and aircraft.

Materials of construction
While steel and concrete remain one of the most popular choices for tanks, glass-reinforced plastic, thermoplastic and polyethylene tanks are increasing in popularity. They offer lower build costs and greater chemical resistance, especially for storage of speciality chemicals. There are several relevant standards, such as British Standard 4994 (1989), DVS (German Welding Institute) 2205, and ASME (American Society of Mechanical Engineers) RTP-1  which give advice on wall thickness, quality control procedures, testing procedures, accreditation, fabrication and design criteria of final product.

Tank failures
There have been numerous catastrophic failures of storage tanks, one of the most notorious being that which occurred at Boston Massachusetts USA on January 14, 1919. The large tank had only been filled eight times when it failed, and the resulting wave of molasses killed 21 people in the vicinity. The Boston molasses disaster was caused by poor design and construction, with a wall too thin to bear repeated loads from the contents. The tank had not been tested before use by filling with water, and was also poorly riveted. The owner of the tank, United States Industrial Alcohol Company, paid out $300,000 (nearly $4 million in 2012 ) in compensation to the victims or their relatives.

There have been many other accidents caused by tanks since then, often caused by faulty welding or by sub-standard steel. New inventions have at least fixed some of the more common issues around the tanks' seal. However, storage tanks also present another problem, surprisingly, when empty. If they have been used to hold oil or oil products such as gasoline, the atmosphere in the tanks may be highly explosive as the space fills with hydrocarbons. If new welding operations are started, then sparks can easily ignite the contents, with disastrous results for the welders. The problem is similar to that of empty bunkers on tanker ships, which are now required to use an inert gas blanket to prevent explosive atmospheres building up from residues.

Images

Etymology
The word "tank" originally meant "artificial lake" and came from India, perhaps via Portuguese tanque. It may have some connection with:
Some Indian language words similar to "tak" or "tank" and meaning "reservoir for water". In Sanskrit a holding pond or reservoir is called a tadaka. Gujarati talao means "man-made lake". These uses of the word were incorporated into the English language.
The Arabic verb istanqa`a اِسْتَنْقَعَ = "it [i.e. some liquid] collected and became stagnant".

See also
, also known as a "fish tank"

, in aviation

, in India, an artificial lake or reservoir of any size

, used for fluid mechanics experiments
 a container which holds a supply of air for breathing underwater
, for watering livestock
, in India, a well or reservoir built as part of a temple complex

References

Storage tanks